Brendan Hyland (born 23 September 1994) is an Irish swimmer. He competed in the men's 100 metre butterfly event at the 2017 World Aquatics Championships. Hyland has also competed in the Tokyo 2020 Olympics.

References

External links
 

1994 births
Living people
Irish male swimmers
Place of birth missing (living people)
Male butterfly swimmers
Olympic swimmers of Ireland
Swimmers at the 2020 Summer Olympics